"Unbelievable" is a song written and recorded by British band EMF, originally appearing on their debut album, Schubert Dip (1991). It was released as a single in the UK in October 1990, peaking at number three on the UK Singles Chart on 1 December 1990. It was the 32nd-best-selling single of 1990 in the UK, and a top 10 hit also in Belgium, Germany, Ireland, the Netherlands, Norway, Spain and Sweden. In the United States, it hit number one on the Billboard Hot 100 in 1991. The song was produced by Ralph Jezzard, and contains samples of US comedian Andrew Dice Clay and a Black Panther Party member shouting "What the fuck?"

Background and release
Guitarist and principal songwriter of the band, Ian Dench, has stated that the melody to the song came into his head as he was riding on his bike. Still obsessed by his girlfriend who had dumped him, the idea came to him while on his way home. Dench had learned to play classical guitar and also loved the blues. The guitar riff in the song goes from blues mode to flamenco mode, "like the two conflicting sides of his life", as he told in an interview with The Guardian. Singer James Atkins had suggested to do Chicago house and Detroit techno, but Dench went for crossover indie/dance music. 

The band made a four-track demo and were invited to London by the record labels. Instead the band suggested that they should come to witness the band perform on a little scene in a pub called Forest of Dean. Virgin, Island and EMI wanted to sign them. The latter drew the longest straw. The “Oh” sample comes from US comedian Andrew Dice Clay, that was released on Def Jam. The band therefore had to get hold of anyone in the Def Jam office to clear the sample. They were flown to Los Angeles to meet EMI. Dench then happened to see Rick Rubin, founder of Def Jam, in a bar. He answered, “Fax my office in the morning” and did it for free. Another sample in the song is of a member of Black Panther Party shouting "What the fuck?" "Unbelievable" was released on 22 October 1990 as the first single from Schubert Dip.

The band drew inspiration from American hip-hop for their fashion style, using their first advance to buy really big dodgy puffer jackets like East 17.

Chart performance
"Unbelievable" was very successful on the charts across several continents. In Europe, the song entered the top 10 in Belgium (4), Germany (9), Ireland (5), the Netherlands (6), Norway (8), Spain (6), Sweden (9), Switzerland (3), and the UK. In the latter, it peaked at number three on the UK Singles Chart in its fifth week, on November 25, 1990. The song spent two weeks at the number two position before dropping to number six, seven and ten the following weeks. The single was also a top 10 hit on the Eurochart Hot 100, peaking at number eight in December 1990. 

Outside Europe, "Unbelievable" was a top 20 hit in New Zealand (12), while entering the top 10 also in Australia (8). In the US, the song achieved huge success, charting on four different Billboard charts; number one on the Hot 100, number nine on the Hot Dance Club Play chart, number five on the Hot Dance Music/Maxi-Singles Sales chart and number three on the Modern Rock Tracks chart. It also hit number one on the Cash Box Top 100. In Canada, "Unbelievable" reached number four on the RPM Top Singles chart and number three on the RPM Dance/Urban chart.

The single earned a gold record in Australia (35,000), Canada (50,000) and the United States (500,000), and a silver record in the United Kingdom (200,000).

Critical reception
In 2018, Bill Lamb from About.com noted that the song "mixed intoxicating rhythms, sweet high vocals from lead singer James Atkin, and rousing shouts to storm to the top of the pop charts." In his review of Schubert Dip, AllMusic editor Alex Henderson described the song as "so insanely infectious", remarking its "dizzying infectiousness". Upon the release, J.D. Considine from The Baltimore Sun felt the group's material appeals as much to the brain as the body, so that songs such as "Unbelievable" "end up danceable, hummable, and utterly irresistible." Larry Flick from Billboard declared it as a "insinuating, Manchester-influenced rave. Scratchy, neopsychedelic guitar riffs nicely contrast track's hip hop groove, promising extensive exposure here at both club and radio levels." John Earls from Classic Pop called it "mighty". Annette Petruso from The Michigan Daily stated that the boys from the Forest of Dean "have created an undeniably perfect pop single with the ultra-simple, ultra-catchy and ultra-overplayed "Unbelievable"." Andrew Collins from NME complimented it as a "special record", writing, "It's their first, and it's crunchier than the breakfast cereal Start. Sex-flavoured bass, hoppity drums, unfettered guitar, and a shouting sample that might be stupid old Andrew Dice Clay for all I know — yes, it's got the lot. Drenched in all the same juices that make PWEI so cool, it even sounds like five people were involved in its construction. I believe."

Music video
A music video was produced to promote the single, directed by American music video director Josh Taft. It received heavy rotation on MTV Europe.

Impact and legacy
The song was ranked no. 31 on VH1's "100 Greatest One-Hit Wonders" in 2002 and no. 98 on VH1's "100 Greatest Songs of the 90s" in 2007. Australian music channel Max placed it at number 547 in their list of "1000 Greatest Songs of All Time" in 2011. Rolling Stone listed "Unbelievable" at number 12 in their "20 Biggest Songs of the Summer: The 1990s" list in July 2014. In 2020, Cleveland.com listed it at number 41 in their ranking of the best Billboard Hot 100 No. 1 song of the 1990s.

Formats and track listings
 UK 7" (R 6273)
"Unbelievable" – 3:30
"EMF" (live at The Bilson) – 3:53

 UK CD (CDR 6273)
"Unbelievable" – 3:30
"Unbelievable" (The Cin City Sex Mix) – 5:14
"EMF" (live at The Bilson) – 3:53

 US CD (E2-56210)
"Unbelievable" (single version) – 3:30
"Unbelievable" (Cin City Sex Mix) – 5:14
"Unbelievable" (Boot Lane Mix) – 6:20
"Unbelievable" (House Mix) – 4:26
"Unbelievable" (Hip Hop Mix) – 4:10
"EMF" (live at The Bilson) – 3:53

Charts and sales

Weekly charts

Year-end charts

All-time charts

Certifications

See also
List of Billboard Hot 100 number-one singles of 1991
List of Cash Box Top 100 number-one singles of 1991

References

1990 songs
1990 debut singles
1991 singles
Billboard Hot 100 number-one singles
Cashbox number-one singles
EMF (band) songs
EMI Records singles
Parlophone singles